Below are the team rosters for the baseball competition at the 1984 Summer Olympics.

White Division

Chinese Taipei

 George Chao, DH/1B
 Chiang Tai-Chuan, DH
 Chuang Sheng-Hsiung, P
 Kuo Tai-Yuan, P
 Lee Chu-Ming, CF
 Lu Wen-sheng, 2B
 Li Chih-Chun, LF
 Lin Hua-Wei, 3B
 Lin I-Tseng, RF
 Liu Chiu-Lung, P
 Sung Yung-Tai, 1B/LF/CF
 Tsai Sen-Fong, RF
 Tseng Chih-chen, C
 Tu Fu-Ming, P
 Tu Hung-Chin, P
 Twu Jong-Nan, C
 Wu Fu-Lien, SS
 Wu Te-Shen, 3B/SS
 Yang Ching-Long, 1B
 Yeh Chih-Shien, 2B

Dominican Republic

 Rafael Almonte, P
 Nelson Cespedes, P
 Ivan Crispin, SS
 Nicholas Domitilo, P
 Jose Florentino, P
 Junio Gelbal, C
 Pedro Gomez, 1B
 Victor Gomez, P
 Orlando Guerreo, 2B
 Secundina Lora, P
 Ramón Martínez, P
 Miguel Mota, LF
 Jony Olivo, P
 Hector Paniagua, RF
 Francisco Pans, 2B
 Bernardo Reyes, CF
 Antonio Sanchez, DH
 Abad Santana, C
 Aristides Taveras, 3B

Italy

 Ruggero Bagialemani, 2B
 Roberto Bianchi, DH
 Giuseppe Carelli, RF
 Paolo Ceccaroli, P
 David Chiono, P
 Louis Colabello, P
 Giovanni Costa, 3B
 Keith D'Amato, P
 David DiMarco, 1B
 David Farina, P
 Massimo Fochi, P
 Paolo Gagliano, 2B/CF
 Johnnyjoseph Guggiana, 3B
 Anthony Lo Nero, C
 Roberto Man, P
 Stefano Manzini, LF
 David Marco, 1B
 Michele Romano, SS
 Mark Talarico, CF/LF
 Guglielmo Trinci, 1B/LF
 Robert John Turcio, DH/P

United States

 Sid Akins, P
 Flavio Alfaro, SS
 Don August, P
 Scott Bankhead, P
 Bob Caffrey, DH/C
 Will Clark, DH/LF
 Mike Dunne, P
 Gary Green, SS
 Chris Gwynn, RF
 John Hoover, P
 Barry Larkin, 2B/DH/LF
 Shane Mack, LF/RF
 John Marzano, C
 Oddibe McDowell, CF
 Mark McGwire, 1B
 Robert Myers, P
 Pat Pacillo, P
 Cory Snyder, 3B
 B. J. Surhoff, C
 Bill Swift, P
 Bobby Witt, P
 Mac Varner, 1B

Blue Division

Canada

 Henry Andrulis, DH
 Larry Downes, 1B
 Mike Gardiner, P
 Joe Heeney, DH
 Rod Heisler, P
 John Ivan, 3B
 Barry Kuzminski, P
 Scott Mann, RF
 Scott Maxwell, LF
 Bob McCullough, SS
 Doug McPhail, CF
 Tom Nelson, 2B
 Alain Patenaude, P
 Rob Thomson, C
 Steve Wilson, P
 Mark Wooden, P
 Michael Carnegie, P

Japan

 Yukio Arai, RF
 Katsuyuki Fukumoto, 1B
 Shinichi Furukawa, LF
 Shinji Hata, DH/C
 Katsumi Hirosawa, DH/1B
 Akimitsu Ito, P
 Atsunori Ito, P
 Terumitsu Kumano, CF
 Kazutomo Miyamoto, P
 Noboru Morita, LF
 Yoshihiko Morita, SS
 Yoshiaki Nishikawa, P
 Munehiko Shimada, C
 Kozo Shoda, 2B
 Kazuaki Ueda, DH/3B
 Yasushi Urahigashi, 3B
 Yutaka Wada, 1B/2B/DH
 Akira Yonemura, P
 Yasuo Yoshida, C
 Yukio Yoshida, P

Korea

 Ahn Un-Hak, 1B/SS/3B
 Baek In-Ho, SS
 Choy Kai-Young, DH/LF/RF
 Han Hee-Min, P
 Kang Ki-Woong, 2B
 Kim Hyoung-Suk, 1B
 Kim Yong-Kuk, 3B
 Kim Yong-soo, P
 Kim Young-Sin, C
 Lee Jong-Doo, RF/DH
 Lee Kang-Don, DH/RF
 Lee Sang-Kun, P
 Lee Soon Chul, LF/CF
 Oh Myong-Lok, P
 Park Heung-Sik, CF
 Park Noh-Jun, P/DH
 Sun Dong-Ryeul, P
 Yoo Joong-Il, SS
 Yoon Hak-Kil, P

Nicaragua

 Luis Arauz, P
 Leonardo Cardenas, CF/RF
 Juan Centeno, P
 Cesar Chavarria, C
 Francisco Cruz, P
 José Cruz, RF/CF
 Ariel Delgado, 3B
 Roberto Espino, 1B
 Julio Espinoza, P
 Fabio Garcia, CF
 Juan Garmendez, DH
 Jose Guzman, C
 Julio Medina, 2B
 Jaime Miranda, RF
 Julio Moya, P
 Arnoldo Munoz, SS
 Diego Raudez, P
 Julio Sanchez, 1B/DH
 Richard Taylor, LF

References

 
 Official Report. Official Report of the Games of the XXIIIrd Olympiad Los Angeles, 1984.
 1984 Los Angeles Dodgers Media Guide

Team squads
1984